The following is a list of notable deaths in May 1996.

Entries for each day are listed alphabetically by surname. A typical entry lists information in the following sequence:
 Name, age, country of citizenship at birth, subsequent country of citizenship (if applicable), reason for notability, cause of death (if known), and reference.

May 1996

1
Herbert Brownell, 92, American politician, cancer.
Billy Byers, 69, American jazz trombonist and arranger.
François Chalais, 76, French journalist, leukemia.
Jim Gleeson, 84, American baseball player.
Eric Houghton, 85, English football player and manager.
David M. Kennedy, 90, American diplomat, cardiovascular disease.
Luana Patten, 57, American actress (Song of the South, Johnny Tremain, Joe Dakota), respiratory failure.

2
Emile Habibi, 73, Palestinian-Israeli writer and communist politician, cancer.
Danny Kamekona, 60, American actor (The Karate Kid Part II, Problem Child, Honeymoon in Vegas).
María Luisa Ponte, 77, Spanish actress.
Henri Rust, 90, Dutch film editor.
Douglas Houghton, Baron Houghton of Sowerby, 97, British politician.

3
Guy Casaril, 62, French film director.
Donald G. Fink, 84, American engineer.
Tim Gullikson, 44, American tennis player and coach, brain cancer.
Alex Kellner, 71, American baseball player.
Hermann Kesten, 96, German writer.
Detlev Kittstein, 52, German field hockey player.
Patsy Montana, 87, American country music singer-songwriter.
Ray Stevens, 60, American professional wrestler, heart attack.
Jack Weston, 71, American actor (Dirty Dancing, The Thomas Crown Affair, The Ritz), lymphoma.
Keith Daniel Williams, 48, American murderer, execution by lethal injection.

4
Jean Crépin, 87, French Army officer during World War II, the First Indochina War and the Algerian War.
Edward E. Haddock, 84, American politician.
Gus Keriazakos, 64, American baseball player.
Eduardo Franco Raymundo, 62, Spanish chess player.

5
Gaëtan Duval, 65, Mauritian politician.
David Lasser, 94, American writer and political activist.
Rodney M. Love, 87, American politician.
Jokūbas Minkevičius, 75, Lithuanian politician.
Ai Qing, 86, Chinese poet.
Salli Terri, 73, Canadian-American singer and arranger.
Charles H. Zimmerman, 88, American aeronautical engineer.

6
Donald T. Campbell, 79, American psychologist and scholar.
Geoffrey S. Dawes, 78, British fetal physiologist.
Ed Love, 85, American animator.
Hamlet Mkhitaryan, 33, Soviet/Russian football player, brain cancer.
Wally Nightingale, 40, British musician, drug-related illness.
Suzanne Ridgeway, 78, American film actress.
Leo Joseph Suenens, 91, Belgian Roman Catholic cardinal, thrombosis.

7
William Copley, 77, American painter, writer, and gallerist.
Don McNeill, 88, American radio personality.
Albert Meltzer, 76, British anarchist.
Narciso G. Reyes, 82, Filipino diplomat and author.
José Lázaro Robles, 72, Brazilian football player.
Howard Smith, 76, British diplomat.

8
Beryl Burton, 58, English racing cyclist, heart attack.
Serge Chermayeff, 95, Russian-British architect, industrial designer, and writer.
Luis Miguel Dominguín, 69, Spanish bullfighter, cerebral hemorrhage.
Robert Geib, 84, Luxembourgish football player.
Ludwig Hoelscher, 88, German composer, musician and music educator.
Bill Naito, 70, American businessman, civic leader and philanthropist, cancer.
Celedonio Romero, 83, Spanish musician.
Karl Ullrich, 85, German SS officer during World War II.
Garth Williams, 84, American children's illustrator.

9
Khaptad Baba, 1995, Nepalese spiritual saint.
Lu Dingyi, 89, Chinese politician.
Carl Fallberg, 80, American cartoonist and artist.
Gustave Gingras, 78, Canadian physician.
Calvin Waller, 58, United States Army lieutenant general, complications from a heart attack.

10
Jože Babič, 79, Slovenian filmmaker.
Poul Borum, 61, Danish poet and writer.
Joe Holden, 82, American baseball player, manager and scout.
Ethel Smith, 93, American organist.
Curt Teichert, 91, German-American palaeontologist and geologist.

11
Nnamdi Azikiwe, 91, President of Nigeria.
Rodney Culver, 26, American football running back, plane crash.
Ademir de Menezes, 73, Brazilian football player and manager.
Øivind Johannessen, 71, Norwegian football player.
Sam Ragan, 80, American poet.
Vittorio Sala, 77, Italian screenwriter and film director.
Princess Maria de los Dolores of Bourbon-Two Sicilies, 86, Sicillian princess.
Mikheil Tumanishvili, 75, Soviet theatre director.
Merrill B. Twining, 93, United States Marine Corps general.
Ivan Vyshnevskyi, 39, Ukrainian football player, melanoma.
Margaret Wright, 76, American politician and community activist.
Notable climbers killed in the 1996 Mount Everest disaster
Scott Fischer, 40, American mountaineer.
Rob Hall, 35, New Zealand mountaineer.
Yasuko Namba, 47, Japanese businesswoman.
Andy Harris, 31, New Zealand mountain guide.

12
Ghazaleh Alizadeh, 47, Iranian poet and writer, suicide.
Richard Kendall Brooke, 66, South African ornithologist.
Homer Keller, 81, American composer of contemporary classical music.
Mohamed Abdel Rahman, 81, Egyptian fencer.
Martin Roman, 86, German jazz pianist.

13
Harry Hyde, 71, American NASCAR crew chief, myocardial infarction.
William Hughes Mulligan, 78, American judge.
Morris Edward Opler, 89, American anthropologist.
Chaim Menachem Rabin, 80, Israeli linguist.

14
Marian Barone, 72, American gymnast and olympian.
Vera Chapman, 98, British writer.
Edward Gurney, 82, American attorney and politician.
Jan Hertl, 67, Czech football player.
Sridharan Jeganathan, 44, Sri Lankan cricket player.
Ludwig Preiß, 85, German politician.
Dick Randall, 70, American filmmaker.
Adone Stellin, 75, Italian association football player.
Kumi Sugai, 77, Japanese painter, sculptor and printmaker.
Usilaimani, 62, Tamil actor.
Leopold Šťastný, 84, Czechoslovak soccer player and coach.

15
Nordine Ben Ali, 76, Algerian-French football player and manager.
Javier del Granado, 83, Bolivian writer.
Newt V. Mills, 96, American politician.
Paul Nogier, 87, French neurologist and physician.
Virgil Walter Ross, 88, American animator.

16
Danilo Alvim, 75, Brazilian football player and manager, pneumonia.
Jeremy Michael Boorda, 56, American admiral, suicide.
Claude Gordon, 80, American trumpeter, band director, educator, and author, cancer.
Olga Madar, 80, American labor unionist.

17
Scott Brayton, 37, American open-wheel racing driver, racing accident.
Willis Conover, 75, American radio producer, lung cancer.
Mary Haas, 86, American linguist.
Rusi Modi, 71, Indian cricket player.
Nick Origlass, 88, Australian Trotskyist politician.
Johnny "Guitar" Watson, 61, American musician and singer-songwriter, myocardial infarction.

18
Czesław Bobrowski, 92, Polish politician and economist.
Mario Braggiotti, 90, American pianist, composer and raconteur.
Dawee Chullasapya, 81, Thai Air Force air marshal.
Chet Forte, 60, American television director and sports radio talk show host, heart attack.
Kevin Gilbert, 29, American musician, accidental asphyxiation.
Yosef Porat, 86, German-Israeli chess player.
T. B. Werapitiya, 71, Sri Lankan cricket player.

19
John Beradino, 79, American baseball player and actor, pancreatic cancer.
Herbert Büchs, 82, German Air Force officer.
Jake Ford, 50, American basketball player.
Hideji Hōjō, 93, Japanese author, novelist, and playwright.
Janaki Ramachandran, 72, Indian actor and politician, cardiac arrest.
Margaret Rawlings, 89, English actress.
Charles Verlinden, 89, Belgian medievalist.
Zygmunt Ziembiński, 75, Polish legal philosopher and logician.

20
Jean-Jacques Delbo, 87, French actor.
Dean Harens, 75, American actor.
Jon Pertwee, 76, English actor, comedian, cabaret performer and TV presenter, heart attack.
Janez Vidic, 73, Slovene painter and illustrator.

21
Vladimir Belyakov, 78, Soviet gymnast.
Paul Delph, 39, American musician.
Raffaele di Paco, 87, Italian road racing cyclist.
Karl Hoffmann, 81, German Indologist.
Fernando Volio Jiménez, 71, Costa Rican politician.
Lash LaRue, 78, American actor, pulmonary emphysema.
Fritz Ligges, 57, German equestrian, heart attack.

22
Robert Christie, 82, Canadian actor and director.
Cuthbert Hurd, 85, American computer scientist and entrepreneur.
Seymour H. Knox III, 70, American sports executive.
Veikko Lavi, 84, Finnish singer, songwriter and writer.
Maurice Piot, 83, French fencer.
George H. Smith, 73, American writer.
Wong Peng Soon, 78, Malaysian badminton player, pneumonia.

23
Abu Ubaidah al-Banshiri, 46, Egyptian al-Qaeda leader, drowned.
Patrick Cargill, 77, English actor, brain cancer.
Dorothy Hyson, 81, American actress, stroke.
Sim Iness, 65, Athletics competitor.
Evert Karlsson, 75, Swedish ski jumper.
Bernhard Klodt, 69, German football player, heart attack.
Kronid Lyubarsky, 62, Soviet dissident, heart attack.
Tanju Okan, 57, Turkish recording artist; singer, cirrhosis.
Peter Pasetti, 79, German actor, cancer.

24
John Abbott, 90, English actor.
Jorge Bolaños, 51, Ecuadorian football player.
Harry Campion, 91, British statistician and director.
Thomas Connolly, 86,United States Navy admiral , aviator, gymnast and Olympic medalist.
José Cuatrecasas, 93, Spanish-American pharmacist and botanist.
Jacob Druckman, 67, American composer, lung cancer.
Enrique Álvarez Félix, 62, Mexican actor, heart attack.
Johan Kraag, 82, President of Suriname.
Joseph Mitchell, 87, American writer.
Kshitindramohan Naha, 64, Indian geologist and professor.
Lois Pereiro, 38, Poet; writer, AIDS-related complications.
Norman René, 45, American director, AIDS-related complications.
Roland Varno, 88, Dutch-American actor and secret agent.

25
Renzo De Felice, 67, Italian historian.
John Morrison, 1st Baron Margadale, 89, British politician.
Guy Mazeline, 96, French writer.
Bradley Nowell, 28, American musician and the lead singer and guitarist of Sublime, opioid overdose.
Vladimir Ukhov, 72, Russian racewalker.
Barney Wilen, 59, French saxophonist.
Dimitar Yordanov, 66, Bulgarian football player.

26
Ole Berntsen, 81, Danish sailor.
Don Bollweg, 75, American baseball player.
Haika Grossman, 76, Israeli politician and member of Knesset.
Gerard Hallock, 90, American ice hockey player.
Stefan Jędrychowski, 86, Polish journalist and communist politician.
Ovidiu Papadima, 86, Romanian literary critic, folklorist, and essayist.
Milan Ribar, 66, Yugoslav/Croatian football manager.
Heije Schaper, 89, Dutch lieutenant general of the Royal Netherlands Air Force and politician.
Mike Sharperson, 34, American baseball player, accident.

27
George Boolos, 55, American philosopher and mathematical logician, pancreas cancer.
Pud Brown, 79, American jazz reed player.
Aksel Bonde Hansen, 77, Danish rower.
Philip B. Healey, 74, American politician.

28
Walter Brandi, 68, Italian actor.
Nirmala Devi, 68, Indian film actress and singer.
George Kojac, 86, American swimmer and Olympic champion.
Rollin Prather, 70, Canadian football player.
Jimmy Rowles, 77, American jazz pianist, vocalist, and composer.

29
Jennings Lang, 81, American actor, pneumonia.
Isidro Maiztegui, 90, Argentinian composer.
Antonín Mrkos, 78, Czech astronomer.
Hrant Shahinyan, 72, Soviet/Armenian gymnast.
Jeremy Sinden, 45, British actor, lung cancer.
Tamara Toumanova, 77, Russian ballet dancer.

30
John Cameron, Lord Cameron, 96, Scottish judge.
Heather Canning, 63, English actress.
William Dally, 88, American rower.
Léon-Étienne Duval, 92, French catholic prelate and cardinal.
François Genoud, 80, Swiss Nazi collaborator, suicide.
John Kahn, 48, American bass guitarist.
Alo Mattiisen, 35, Estonian composer.
Arthur "T-Boy" Ross, 47, American singer-songwriter.
Natividad Vacío, 83, American actor.

31
Walter C. Beckham, 80, United States Army Air Forces fighter ace and nuclear scientist.
Ton de Leeuw, 69, Dutch composer.
Luciano Lama, 74, Italian politician and trade unionist.
Timothy Leary, 75, American psychologist and writer, prostate cancer.
Thomas Francis Xavier Smith, 67, American politician, cancer.

References 

1996-05
 05